The Haupt Collection entitled "Thirty Pieces of Silver — Art and Money" is a thematic Berlin-based collection of contemporary art curated by Stefan Haupt. The collection is dedicated to the topic of money all media. It is shown in rotating exhibitions in both national museums and art galleries, as well as by appointment in the space of Haupt's Law Firm.

Formation 

Initially dedicated to the photographic medium, Haupt shifted his focus to money art in the mid-'90s, inspired by an origami sculpture by New York-based Taiwanese artist Lee Mingwei. In the following years, this inspiration developed through visits to art fairs and galleries, as well as Internet research.

Range 

The collection comprises some 200 works in varying techniques and approaches that provide an overview of the study of money in contemporary art. 
Significant works in the collection, among others, are the work $ by the French light artist Mathieu Mercier, "Hidden Object III" by Timm Ulrichs and several works by Joseph Beuys.

Also represented in the collection (selected):

Exhibitions (selected) 
 "Art and Money — Collection Haupt", Exhibition at the Halle am Wasser, Kunst-Campus Berlin at the Hamburger Train Station, 10. September to October 8, 2011
 "Thirty Pieces of Silver – Art and Money" — Collection Haupt – Altmärkisches Museum Stendal, May 20 September 2, 2012
 "Real or Fake? An Exhibition about Money and its Counterfeits", Works from the Haupt Collection at the Museum of the Printing Arts Leipzig, October 14 to December 7, 2012
 "MONEY, MONEY, MONEY" – Exhibition of the Haupt Collection at the Kunstforum Halle, August 20 to September 15, 2013
 "DIVIDED AND REUNIFIED", selected works from the Haupt Collection, curated by Tina Sauerländer, satellite program of Art Market Budapest 2014, A38, Budapest, Hungary

Literature 
 ''Haupt Collection, Thirty Pieces of Silver – Art and Money, Hermann Büchner and Tina Sauerländer, Braus, 2013 –

External links 
 Haupt Collection
 German Association for Numismatic Art
 KUNST-Magazine – article over the exhibition at the Kunstforum Halle
 Article about the collection in artparasites.com magazine
 Information about the exhibition at Art Market Budapest

Notes and references

Private art collections
Art museums and galleries in Berlin
Numismatic museums in Germany